Dhandhuka is one of the 182 Legislative Assembly constituencies of Gujarat state in India. It is part of Ahmedabad district.

List of segments
This assembly seat represents the following segments,

 Dhandhuka Taluka
 Ranpur Taluka
 Barwala Taluka
 dholera taluka

Members of Legislative Assembly

Election results

2022 
 

-->

2017

2012

2007

2002

See also
 List of constituencies of the Gujarat Legislative Assembly
 Ahmedabad district

References

External links
 

Assembly constituencies of Gujarat
Ahmedabad district